Pedang     is a village development committee in the Himalayas of Taplejung District in the Province No. 1 of north-eastern Nepal. At the time of the 2011 Nepal census it had a population of 1701 people living in 344 individual household.

References

External links
UN map of the municipalities of Taplejung District

Populated places in Taplejung District